Geum borisii may refer to the following plants of the genus Geum:
 in botanical literature:
Geum borisii  = the hybrid Geum bulgaricum × Geum montanum
 Geum borisii  = the hybrid Geum bulgaricum × Geum reptans
 in gardening literature:
 Geum coccineum
 Geum quellyon

References 

borisii